The Colosseum at Caesars Palace is a theater located on the Las Vegas Strip in Las Vegas, Nevada, United States. It is the main entertainment venue for Caesars Palace.

The venue opened in 2003 and has an estimated seating capacity of 4,100 spectators. Its design is inspired by the architecture of ancient Rome along with aspects of contemporary architecture. The cost of the theater was $108 million, becoming the most expensive entertainment venue in Las Vegas, beating the "O" Theater at the Bellagio Las Vegas.

Deemed the Home of the Greatest Entertainers in the World, the Colosseum has hosted numerous concert residencies by Madonna, Celine Dion, Elton John, Reba McEntire, Brooks & Dunn, Usher, Rod Stewart, Cher, Bette Midler, Shania Twain, Mariah Carey, and Adele. Celine Dion has had the longest residency (1,141 shows as of June 8, 2019) at the venue grossing a total of $650 million since her arrival in 2003. She also performed her record-breaking 1000th show at the venue on October 8, 2016.

Background

In 2000, Caesars Palace made plans to renovate the defunct Circus Maximus Showroom (opened 1966). During this time, the owners were approached about a new business venture with Celine Dion. Once the venture was launched, the renovation was cancelled. A new entertainment venue was set to be built in place of the old showroom. The showroom closed in September 2000 with a performance by Steve and Eydie. The theatre was built specially to house Celine Dion's "A New Day...". The construction was initiated by Park Place Entertainment to coincide with other renovations to the hotel complex including additional retail space, meeting areas, restaurants, spas, and a 20-story all-suites hotel tower. The original construction cost was estimated to be between $65 to $75 million. Additional technical aspects drove cost to over $100 million.

The theatre was designed by the world-renowned firm Scéno Plus and constructed by Perini Building Company, with the project beginning in December 2002 and completed on February 4, 2003 (six weeks before its estimated completion date), opening on March 25, 2003. Dion filmed a television special for CBS to showcase the first night of her residency (entitled "Celine in Las Vegas, Opening Night Live", hosted by Justin Timberlake), including behind the scenes look at the theatre and the show.

Since its incarnation, the venue is operated by AEG Live and is currently owned by Caesars Entertainment. The success of Dion's show drew more entertainers to perform at the theatre. Elton John brought his Red Piano show to the theatre from 2004, until 2009. Additional entertainers include Kylie Minogue, Diana Ross, Romina Arena, Faith Hill, Ricky Martin and Luis Miguel. The venue has also hosted numerous comedy shows by Kathy Griffin, Jerry Seinfeld, Chelsea Handler, Dave Chappelle and Ellen DeGeneres. The premiere of the 11th season of Hell's Kitchen was filmed in front of a live audience at The Colosseum.

In 2018, Celine Dion filmed in the venue the music video for her song Ashes from the movie Deadpool 2 alongside Canadian actor Ryan Reynolds.

Technical aspects
The design for the theatre was based on the ancient Colosseum in Rome. It is connected to the casino near the Forum Shops. It was designed with 180,000 watts of amplification and 139 speakers. The video screen provides the illusion of 3D stage scenery.

The stage itself includes ten motorized stage lifts which compose 75 percent of the stage. Unlike the Colosseum in Rome, the theatre was built in an intimate setting, with the furthest seating being  from the stage.  To reinforce its intimacy, the venue is equipped with 200 acoustical panels to control the amplified sound.

Performance history

Headliners

Shows

Accolades
Billboard Backstage Pass Awards: "Top Small Venue" (2004)
Billboard Magazine: "Venue of the Decade" (for venues 5,000 and under) (2009)
Billboard Touring Awards: "Top Small Venue" (2005–2007; 2009–2010)
Las Vegas Review-Journal: "Best of Las Vegas" (2010)
Pollstar Concert Industry Awards: 100 Top Selling Theater Venues (2006)

Source:

References

External links
 
 

2003 establishments in Nevada
Buildings and structures in Paradise, Nevada
Music venues in the Las Vegas Valley
Theatres in Nevada
Caesars Palace